The British Swimming Championships are an annual event organised by British Swimming (the governing body of swimming in the United Kingdom).

History
The event is usually held in March or April each year in a long course (50 m) swimming pool, with the results usually acting as selection trials for upcoming international level competitions due to be held in the following summer season.

Previously the event was known as the Amateur Swimming Association (ASA) National Championships. A list of past winners shows the winners of all disciplines.

Venues and dates

Sponsors
1971-1984 (Optrex)
1985-1987 (Hewlett-Packard)
1988-1990 (TSB)
1992-1992 (Optrex)
1993-1994 (Mycil)

See also
British Swimming
List of British Swimming Championships champions

References

National swimming competitions
Swimming in the United Kingdom